Gazalina transversa is a moth of the family Notodontidae first described by Frederic Moore in 1879. It is found in Sikkim in India and in China.

References

Moths described in 1879
Thaumetopoeinae